UAL or ual may refer to:

Education
 University of the Arts London, a public research university in London, UK
 Universidade Autónoma de Lisboa, a private university in Lisbon, Portugal
 University of Action Learning, a unaccredited online university based in Port Vila, Vanuatu
 Üsküdar Amerikan Lisesi, the Üsküdar American Academy, a high school in Istanbul, Turkey

Transportation
 United Airlines (ICAO airline designator), a US airline
 United Airlines Holdings, its parent company along with its NASDAQ stock ticker
 United American Lines, an American passenger steamship line (1920–1926)

Other uses
 Ual (tool), a sand clock-shaped grinding tool used by the Bodo people
 United Agencies, Ltd., a liquor producer in India that made brands including Blenders Pride
 Ultrasound-assisted liposuction, a surgical procedure
 Unified Assembly Language, an ARM architecture computer language